Au Pied de Cochon is a restaurant in Montreal, Quebec, Canada. It is located at 536 Duluth Street East in the borough of Le Plateau-Mont-Royal. Au Pied de Cochon also has a Sugar Shack and La Cabane d'à Côté in St-Benoît de Mirabel, which are open to normal reservations during the maple sugar season. The restaurant was founded by chef Martin Picard in 2001. In 2019, the Montreal location was named the 34th best restaurant in Canada, according to Canada's 100 Best.

Reception
Celebrity chef Anthony Bourdain visited Au Pied de Cochon on his program No Reservations.

In 2020, the Sugar Shack was featured in an episode, season 3 episode 5, of the Netflix show Somebody Feed Phil.

References

External links

2001 establishments in Quebec
Le Plateau-Mont-Royal
Restaurants established in 2001
Restaurants in Montreal